"Is It True" is a song by australian-psychedelic band Tame Impala and is the 6th and final single released in promotion of their 4th studio album, The Slow Rush. While it was initially released on February 14, 2020 as the 9th track on the album, it would be released as a standalone single on August 7, 2020.

The song would be remixed by Four Tet for the deluxe edition of the album called "The Slow Rush – B-Sides and Remixes". A visulizer would be made for the remix in a similar style to the lyric video.

The song peaked at #15 on US Rock Airplay and #10 on US Hot Rock & Alternative Songs

Promotion 
Tame Impala performed the song live on the The Late Show with Stephen Colbert during Covid lockdown where on the video of the performence he "cloned himself" for the video.

Composition 
The song has been described as a Disco track and a Boogie track. The song has also been noted for being one of the more fun & happy tracks on the record featuring progressive and Vegas Strip-esk synthesizer work. The song has also been described as being a Pharrell Williams like track

Lyric Video 
The lyric video was released on August 6, 2020 and features Kevin Parker singing the track over trippy & psychedelic visuals. The music video has been described as being reminiscent of Tame Impala's live shows as it also features visuals used in previous live shows. The music video also looks like it is being played on VHS tape with an "old-school TV Screen". The lyrics appear on the video in all white hue at the bottom of the screen.

Charts

Certifications

References 

Tame Impala songs
2020 singles
2020 songs
Songs written by Kevin Parker (musician)
Song recordings produced by Kevin Parker (musician)
Disco songs
Boogie songs